A radionuclide (radioactive nuclide, radioisotope or radioactive isotope) is a nuclide that has excess nuclear energy, making it unstable. This excess energy can be used in one of three ways: emitted from the nucleus as gamma radiation; transferred to one of its electrons to release it as a conversion electron; or used to create and emit a new particle (alpha particle or beta particle) from the nucleus. During those processes, the radionuclide is said to undergo radioactive decay. These emissions are considered ionizing radiation because they are energetic enough to liberate an electron from another atom. The radioactive decay can produce a stable nuclide or will sometimes produce a new unstable radionuclide which may undergo further decay. Radioactive decay is a random process at the level of single atoms: it is impossible to predict when one particular atom will decay. However, for a collection of atoms of a single nuclide the decay rate, and thus the half-life (t1/2) for that collection, can be calculated from their measured decay constants. The range of the half-lives of radioactive atoms has no known limits and spans a time range of over 55 orders of magnitude.

Radionuclides occur naturally or are artificially produced in nuclear reactors, cyclotrons, particle accelerators or radionuclide generators. There are about 730 radionuclides with half-lives longer than 60 minutes (see list of nuclides). Thirty-two of those are primordial radionuclides that were created before the earth was formed. At least another 60 radionuclides are detectable in nature, either as daughters of primordial radionuclides or as radionuclides produced through natural production on Earth by cosmic radiation. More than 2400 radionuclides have half-lives less than 60 minutes. Most of those are only produced artificially, and have very short half-lives. For comparison, there are about 251 stable nuclides. (In theory, only 146 of them are stable, and the other 105 are believed to decay via alpha decay, beta decay, double beta decay, electron capture, or double electron capture.)

All chemical elements can exist as radionuclides. Even the lightest element, hydrogen, has a well-known radionuclide, tritium. Elements heavier than lead, and the elements technetium and promethium, exist only as radionuclides. (In theory, elements heavier than dysprosium exist only as radionuclides, but some such elements, like gold and platinum, are observationally stable and their half-lives have not been determined).

Unplanned exposure to radionuclides generally has a harmful effect on living organisms including humans, although low levels of exposure occur naturally without harm. The degree of harm will depend on the nature and extent of the radiation produced, the amount and nature of exposure (close contact, inhalation or ingestion), and the biochemical properties of the element; with increased risk of cancer the most usual consequence. However, radionuclides with suitable properties are used in nuclear medicine for both diagnosis and treatment.  An imaging tracer made with radionuclides is called a radioactive tracer. A pharmaceutical drug made with radionuclides is called a radiopharmaceutical.

Origin

Natural
On Earth, naturally occurring radionuclides fall into three categories: primordial radionuclides, secondary radionuclides, and cosmogenic radionuclides. 
Radionuclides are produced in stellar nucleosynthesis and supernova explosions along with stable nuclides. Most decay quickly but can still be observed astronomically and can play a part in understanding astronomic processes. Primordial radionuclides, such as uranium and thorium, exist in the present time because their half-lives are so long (>100 million years) that they have not yet completely decayed.  Some radionuclides have half-lives so long (many times the age of the universe) that decay has only recently been detected, and for most practical purposes they can be considered stable, most notably bismuth-209: detection of this decay meant that bismuth was no longer considered stable. It is possible decay may be observed in other nuclides, adding to this list of primordial radionuclides. 
Secondary radionuclides are radiogenic isotopes derived from the decay of primordial radionuclides. They have shorter half-lives than primordial radionuclides. They arise in the decay chain of the primordial isotopes thorium-232, uranium-238, and uranium-235. Examples include the natural isotopes of polonium and radium.
Cosmogenic isotopes, such as carbon-14, are present because they are continually being formed in the atmosphere due to cosmic rays.

Many of these radionuclides exist only in trace amounts in nature, including all cosmogenic nuclides. Secondary radionuclides will occur in proportion to their half-lives, so short-lived ones will be very rare. For example, polonium can be found in uranium ores at about 0.1 mg per metric ton (1 part in 1010). Further radionuclides may occur in nature in virtually undetectable amounts as a result of rare events such as spontaneous fission or uncommon cosmic ray interactions.

Nuclear fission
Radionuclides are produced as an unavoidable result of nuclear fission and thermonuclear explosions. The process of nuclear fission creates a wide range of fission products, most of which are radionuclides. Further radionuclides can be created from irradiation of the nuclear fuel (creating a range of actinides) and of the surrounding structures, yielding activation products. This complex mixture of radionuclides with different chemistries and radioactivity makes handling nuclear waste and dealing with nuclear fallout particularly problematic.

Synthetic

Synthetic radionuclides are deliberately synthesised using nuclear reactors, particle accelerators or radionuclide generators:
As well as being extracted from nuclear waste, radioisotopes can be produced deliberately with nuclear reactors, exploiting the high flux of neutrons present. These neutrons activate elements placed within the reactor. A typical product from a nuclear reactor is iridium-192. The elements that have a large propensity to take up the neutrons in the reactor are said to have a high neutron cross-section.
Particle accelerators such as cyclotrons accelerate particles to bombard a target to produce radionuclides. Cyclotrons accelerate protons at a target to produce positron-emitting radionuclides, e.g. fluorine-18.
Radionuclide generators contain a parent radionuclide that decays to produce a radioactive daughter. The parent is usually produced in a nuclear reactor. A typical example is the technetium-99m generator used in nuclear medicine. The parent produced in the reactor is molybdenum-99.

Uses
Radionuclides are used in two major ways: either for their radiation alone (irradiation, nuclear batteries) or for the combination of chemical properties and their radiation (tracers, biopharmaceuticals).
In biology, radionuclides of carbon can serve as radioactive tracers because they are chemically very similar to the nonradioactive nuclides, so most chemical, biological, and ecological processes treat them in a nearly identical way. One can then examine the result with a radiation detector, such as a Geiger counter, to determine where the provided atoms were incorporated. For example, one might culture plants in an environment in which the carbon dioxide contained radioactive carbon; then the parts of the plant that incorporate atmospheric carbon would be radioactive. Radionuclides can be used to monitor processes such as DNA replication or amino acid transport.
in physics and biology radionuclide X-ray fluorescence spectrometry is used to determine chemical composition of the compound. Radiation from a radionuclide source hits the sample and excites characteristic X-rays in the sample. This radiation is registered and the chemical composition of the sample can be determined from the analysis of the measured spectrum. By measuring the energy of the characteristic radiation lines, it is possible to determine the proton number of the chemical element that emits the radiation, and by measuring the number of emitted photons, it is possible to determine the concentration of individual chemical elements.
In nuclear medicine, radioisotopes are used for diagnosis, treatment, and research. Radioactive chemical tracers emitting gamma rays or positrons can provide diagnostic information about internal anatomy and the functioning of specific organs, including the human brain. This is used in some forms of tomography: single-photon emission computed tomography and positron emission tomography (PET) scanning and Cherenkov luminescence imaging. Radioisotopes are also a method of treatment in hemopoietic forms of tumors; the success for treatment of solid tumors has been limited. More powerful gamma sources sterilise syringes and other medical equipment.
In food preservation, radiation is used to stop the sprouting of root crops after harvesting, to kill parasites and pests, and to control the ripening of stored fruit and vegetables. Food irradiation usually uses beta-decaying nuclides with strong gamma emissions like Cobalt-60 or Caesium-137.
In industry, and in mining, radionuclides are used to examine welds, to detect leaks, to study the rate of wear, erosion and corrosion of metals, and for on-stream analysis of a wide range of minerals and fuels.
In spacecraft, radionuclides are used to provide power and heat, notably through radioisotope thermoelectric generators (RTGs) and radioisotope heater units (RHUs).
In astronomy and cosmology, radionuclides play a role in understanding stellar and planetary process. 
In particle physics, radionuclides help discover new physics (physics beyond the Standard Model) by measuring the energy and momentum of their beta decay products (for example, neutrinoless double beta decay and the search for weakly interacting massive particles).
In ecology, radionuclides are used to trace and analyze pollutants, to study the movement of surface water, and to measure water runoffs from rain and snow, as well as the flow rates of streams and rivers. 
In geology, archaeology, and paleontology, natural radionuclides are used to measure ages of rocks, minerals, and fossil materials.

Examples
The following table lists properties of selected radionuclides illustrating the range of properties and uses.

Key: Z = atomic number; N = neutron number; DM = decay mode; DE = decay energy; EC = electron capture

Household smoke detectors

Radionuclides are present in many homes as they are used inside the most common household smoke detectors. The radionuclide used is americium-241, which is created by bombarding plutonium with neutrons in a nuclear reactor. It decays by emitting alpha particles and gamma radiation to become neptunium-237. Smoke detectors use a very small quantity of 241Am (about 0.29 micrograms per smoke detector) in the form of americium dioxide. 241Am is used as it emits alpha particles which ionize the air in the detector's ionization chamber. A small electric voltage is applied to the ionized air which gives rise to a small electric current. In the presence of smoke, some of the ions are neutralized, thereby decreasing the current, which activates the detector's alarm.

Impacts on organisms
Radionuclides that find their way into the environment may cause harmful effects as radioactive contamination. They can also cause damage if they are excessively used during treatment or in other ways exposed to living beings, by radiation poisoning. Potential health damage from exposure to radionuclides depends on a number of factors, and "can damage the functions of healthy tissue/organs. Radiation exposure can produce effects ranging from skin redness and hair loss, to radiation burns and acute radiation syndrome. Prolonged exposure can lead to cells being damaged and in turn lead to cancer. Signs of cancerous cells might not show up until years, or even decades, after exposure."

Summary table for classes of nuclides, stable and radioactive
Following is a summary table for the list of 989 nuclides with half-lives greater than one hour. A total of 251 nuclides have never been observed to decay, and are classically considered stable. Of these, 90 are believed to be absolutely stable except to proton decay (which has never been observed), while the rest are "observationally stable" and theoretically can undergo radioactive decay with extremely long half-lives.

The remaining tabulated radionuclides have half-lives longer than 1 hour, and are well-characterized (see list of nuclides for a complete tabulation). They include 30 nuclides with measured half-lives longer than the estimated age of the universe (13.8 billion years), and another four nuclides with half-lives long enough (> 100 million years) that they are radioactive primordial nuclides, and may be detected on Earth, having survived from their presence in interstellar dust since before the formation of the solar system, about 4.6 billion years ago. Another 60+ short-lived nuclides can be detected naturally as daughters of longer-lived nuclides or cosmic-ray products. The remaining known nuclides are known solely from artificial nuclear transmutation.

Numbers are not exact, and may change slightly in the future, as "stable nuclides" are observed to be radioactive with very long half-lives.

This is a summary table for the 989 nuclides with half-lives longer than one hour (including those that are stable), given in list of nuclides.

List of commercially available radionuclides

This list covers common isotopes, most of which are available in very small quantities to the general public in most countries. Others that are not publicly accessible are traded commercially in industrial, medical, and scientific fields and are subject to government regulation.

Gamma emission only

Beta emission only

Alpha emission only

Multiple radiation emitters

See also
List of nuclides shows all radionuclides with half-life > 1 hour
Hyperaccumulators table – 3
Radioactivity in biology
Radiometric dating
Radionuclide cisternogram
Uses of radioactivity in oil and gas wells

Notes

References

Further reading

External links

EPA – Radionuclides – EPA's Radiation Protection Program: Information.
FDA – Radionuclides – FDA's Radiation Protection Program: Information.
Interactive Chart of Nuclides – A chart of all nuclides
National Isotope Development Center – U.S. Government source of radionuclides – production, research, development, distribution, and information
The Live Chart of Nuclides – IAEA 
Radionuclides production simulator – IAEA 

Radioactivity
Isotopes
Nuclear physics
Nuclear chemistry